Kakkanad is a major industrial and residential region in the city of Kochi in Kerala, India. It is situated in the eastern part of the city and houses the Cochin Special Economic Zone, Infopark, Smart City and KINFRA Export Promotion Industrial Park. It is also the administrative headquarters of the District of Ernakulam.

In the democratic local government, Kakkanad is part of Thrikkakara Municipality. The district office is located in Kakkanad. The collectorate of Ernakulam district is also located here.

History
Kakkanad is located near Thrikkakara, the capital of the mythical King Mahabali.

In verse 273 of Naṉṉūl, a 13th-century book on Tamil grammar, Sankara Namasivayar recites a venpa that describes the twelve districts of Tamil Nadu where Koduntamil is spoken, as Thenpandi Nadu, Kutta Nadu, Kuda Nadu, Karka Nadu, Venadu, Poozhi Nadu, Pandri Nadu, Aruva Nadu, Aruva Vadathalai, Seetha Nadu, Malai Nadu and Punal Nadu. "Karka Nadu" is believed to be a reference to Kakkanad. The old name of kakanad is karkanad-thrikakara.

Administration

Being the administrative hub of Ernakulam district, Kakkanad is home to several state as well as central government offices namely, the Civil Station (hosting The District Collectrate, The RTO etc.), the District Panchayat office, the Airman Selection Board, Siksha Bhavan (office of the Central HRD Ministry),
Kendriya Shram Sadan (office of the Regional Labour Commissioner) etc.

Educational institutions
Jain university
 ISCA – International School of Creative Arts, Knowledge park- Infopark
Rajagiri College of Management and Applied science
 Traum Academy for German and French Languages
 Bhavan's Varuna Vidyalaya
 Bhavan's Adarsha Vidyalaya
 Mar Athanasius HS
 Rajagiri Christu Jayanthi Public School
 Mar Thoma Public School
 Bharata Mata College
 Rajagiri School of Engineering & Technology
Rajagiri College
 St Mary's Higher Secondary School, Morakkala
 The Indian Public School [TIPS], Edichira
 St. Charles Borromeo Convent School [ICSE], Thuthiyoor, Kakkanad
 Mary Matha Public School, Kakkanad

Industry

Kakkanad is home for a portion of the industrial base of Kochi. It is home for the Cochin Special Economic Zone(CSEZ). Carborundum Universal Ltd has a unit near the technopolis. Industrial projects like Fashion City are proposed in Kakkanad. This has led to several builders setting up projects here.

Kakkanad is home for the largest IT Township in India, the Smart City, the second largest IT industrial park in Kerala, the Kochi InfoPark. Kakkanad is also home for a Software Export Promotion Zone (SEPZ). The international submarine cable systems landing in Kochi has their nodes installed in Kakkanad. The CSEZ houses the Cognizant Technology Solutions, Williamslea, WRENCH Solutions, and the Sutherland Global Solutions.

Kakkanad houses the following IT Parks:
 Smart City 
 Infopark
 Muthoot Technopolis
 Kinfra HiTech Park
 Parsvanath IT Park
 Trans-Asia Tech Tower
 HDIL Cyber City
 Electronics City, Kochi
 WTC – World Trade Center, Kochi
− All these together accounts for 25% of IT exports from Kerala.

The Kerala Books and Publications Society has its press at Kakkanad. The press is the biggest multicolor offset printing unit in Kerala Government Sector.

Media
Kakkanad is also the broadcasting hub of Kochi. It is home for the terrestrial relay station of the national television broadcaster, the Doordarshan. Prasar Bharati, the corporation controlling the public broadcast, has a marketing division at Kakkanad.
Kakkanad also hosts the state-owned Kochi FM Radio.
Red FM Regional office is also at Kakkanad on Seaport – Airport Road, near Infopark express way.

Health care
 Sunrise Hospital
 Kusumagiri Mental Health Centre
 Hridya Multi Speciality Clinic
 Thrikkakara Municipal Co-operative Hospital

Other
Wonderla, the largest theme park in the state, is located near Kakkanad.

EMS Co-operative Library, housing over 70,000 titles is located at Kakkanad.

Trinity World Tower is one of the biggest apartment project in Kakkanad. There are 4 towers in Trinity World.

Prestige Forum Mall is proposed opposite Kusumagiri Hospital as part of the township project (Prestige Hillside Gateway) developed by Bangalore-based Prestige Group.

Tulsi Greenfield Villas – Biggest customized villa project near Infopark & Smartcity. 86 villas within a gated community.

Regional Chemical Examiner’s Laboratory, Ernakulam—one of the three laboratories belonging to Chemical Examiner's Laboratory Department under the Government of Kerala—is situated at Kakkanad. It has jurisdiction over central four districts namely Ernakulam, Idukki, Thrissur and Palakkad districts.

ABAD Bluechip is a residential apartment project by ABAD Builders in Kakkanad near to Inforpark and Smartcity Kochi.

Yasoram Builders have constructed the Abode project in Thammanam, Ernakulam.

Luxury furniture shop, Bespoke Furniture and More located in Kaipadamugal, Seaport-Airport Road, Kakkanad

Skyline Spectra is a residential luxury apartment in Kakkanad by Skyline Builders near Infopark, Kakkanad.

SMS Builders have several residential apartment projects with close proximity to Kakkanad.

Codewills is a website development company in Kakkanad inside Infopark, Kakkanad.

Datahub Technologies R&D Pvt Ltd is a software development company focussing on AI and Process automation in Kakkanad near Infopark.

References

External links

Neighbourhoods in Kochi
Smart cities in India